Courted Into Court is an 1896 play by John J. McNally.  It was produced by Charles T. Rich and William Harris for a 140 performance run at the Bijou Theatre on Broadway starting on December 29, 1896. 

Prior to its Broadway debut, it played first on any stage in Omaha, Nebraska on December 4, 1896, and then moved to Kansas City. and Chicago.

Star May Irwin sang and helped popularize (the now notorious example) coon song "All Coons Look Alike to Me" by Ernest Hogan in the play, which had an all-white cast.  She also sang the coon song, "Mr. Johnson, Turn Me Loose" in the play, a song later remembered in all of Irwin's major obituaries.

Cast
 May Irwin at Dottie Dimple
 John C. Rice as Worthington Best, Sr.
 Raymond Hitchcock as Worthington Best, Jr.
 Clara Palmer as Mrs. Worthington Best, Sr.
 Hattie Williams as Helen Best
 Ada Lewis as Mademoiselle Nocodi
 George W. Barnum as Gen. Baron Vladimir Vladistoff
 Joseph M. Sparks as Judge Jeremiah Geoghan
 Jacques Kruger as Pop Dooley
 Sally Cohen as Sylvia Rosebud
 Roland Carter as Mortimer Morton and Sharp Lawyer
 Eva Gilroy as Gertie

References

External links

 

1896 plays